The A27 battery (also known as GP27A, MN27, L828, 27A, V27A, A27BP, G27A) is a dry cell-type battery used in some small remote controls and some cigarette lighters.

An A27 battery is cylindrical, 27.8 mm long and 7.7 mm in diameter, with a typical weight of 4.4 grams, and a typical capacity around 20 mAh.  It has nominal voltage of 12 V.  It is thus similar to the A23 battery, with almost the same length and the same nominal voltage, but thinner, made of eight LR732 button cells.

See also 
 List of battery sizes
 Battery (electricity)

References 

Battery shapes